The 1980 All-Ireland Senior Club Camogie Championship for the leading clubs in the women's team field sport of camogie was won by Killeagh (Cork), who defeated Buffers Alley (Wx) in the final, played at St John’s Park.

Arrangements
The championship was organised on the traditional provincial system used in Gaelic Games since the 1880s, with Oranmore and Kilkeel winning the championships of the other two provinces.

The Final
In the final, Killeagh built up a comfortable lead in the first half and had the speed and stamina to hold on thorough the second half. Buffers Alley set the pace with a fine point from Elsie Walsh, but a goal for Killeagh in the fifth minute which was against the run of play put the Cork team into a lead which they never relinquished. Although the Buffers Alley midfield did well, the forwards failed to use their chances. A goal by Killeagh's Betty Joyce in the 10th minute increased the Cork lead and, although Elsie Walsh continued to pick off points for Buffers Alley, the Wexford team remained in arrears and were trailing by five points at the interval. A Bridie Doran goal just after the restart brought Buffers Alley back into contention and a point from Elsie Walsh a minute later narrowed the deficit to a point. Then the Killeagh team, best served by Betty Joyce, Marie O'Donovan and Pat Moloney, kept up the pressure and added a further goal and a point to their score. Terry Butler did well in the Wexford goal.

Final stages

References

External links
 Camogie Association

1980 in camogie
1980